Eduardo Moreira Fernandes (born August 21, 1977), better known as Vargas Fernandes is a Capeverdean footballer who played as a midfielder.

Career
His first club was Sporting Clube da Praia in his native country, he would lead to win the 1998 regionals.  In 2000, he played in Portugal, starting in Gil Vicente in the Portuguese SuperLiga.  He played as a midfielder there with different clubs, in the 2004-05 season, he played with FC Alverca which was in the lower Liga de Honra (Honour League).  With the club, Vargas Fernandes reached in the second tier Segunda Liga, but released him due to financial problems.  He was one of the first Capeverdeans to play with a Finnish club up north in Tampere and played with Tampereen Peli-Pojat-70 which was in the Second Division, he scored two goals, a season later he spend the next four seasons in Portugal, after his return, he played in Moreirense, Portimonense, Gondomar and Olvieirense, of the goals he scored, he only scored a goal with Portimonense, each in the Segunda Liga.  In 2009, he became the first Capeverdean to play with an Azeri club, Standard Sumgayit, early in the season, Valdas Ivanauskas was coach.  After the end of the season, the club was eleventh and was relegated into the national Second Division, he scored not a single goal there.  Vargas returned to his home country to play with Sporting Clube da Praia in 2010 for the next five seasons, he would become one of the oldest players in the club that played.  During that time, his achievement was the 2012 national championships, the club's ninth and recent title.  His next two successes were regional titles won in 2013 and 2014.

Career statistics

International

Statistics accurate as of match played 9 September 2007

References

External links

1977 births
Living people
Sportspeople from Praia
Footballers from Santiago, Cape Verde
Cape Verdean footballers
Cape Verdean expatriate footballers
Association football midfielders
Sporting Clube da Praia players
Cape Verdean National Championships players
Gil Vicente F.C. players
Lusitânia F.C. players
F.C. Alverca players
Primeira Liga players
Moreirense F.C. players
Portimonense S.C. players
Gondomar S.C. players
U.D. Oliveirense players
FK Standard Sumgayit players
Liga Portugal 2 players
Cape Verdean expatriate sportspeople in Portugal
Cape Verdean expatriate sportspeople in Finland
Expatriate footballers in Portugal
Expatriate footballers in Finland
Expatriate footballers in Azerbaijan
Cape Verde international footballers